The 2012 Superstars Series Spa-Francorchamps round was the sixth round of the 2012 Superstars Series season. It took place on 15 July at the Circuit de Spa-Francorchamps.

Gianni Morbidelli won both races, driving an Audi RS5.

Classification

Qualifying

Notes:
  – Alessandro Garofano and Luca Rangoni were moved to the back of the grid because only Rangoni drove in the session, whereas both drivers would have to drive in.

Race 1

Race 2

Notes:
  – Luigi Ferrara was given a 25-second penalty for exceeding track limits and gaining an advantage on Stefano Gabellini.

Standings after the event

International Series standings

Teams' Championship standings

 Note: Only the top five positions are included for both sets of drivers' standings.

References

Superstars
Superstars Series seasons